Maud Gatel (born 6 April 1979) is a French politician serving as the member of the National Assembly for the 11th constituency of Paris since 2021. A member of the Democratic Movement (MoDem), she replaced Marielle de Sarnez after her death as her substitute. Her constituency covers parts of the 6th and 14th arrondissements.

Career
Gatel was first elected to the Council of Paris in the 2014 municipal election. In 2020, she assumed the presidency of the MoDem group. In 2021, Gatel became the member of the National Assembly for Paris's 11th constituency upon Marielle de Sarnez's death.

She was re-elected in the 2022 French legislative election.

References 

1979 births
Living people
21st-century French politicians
21st-century French women politicians
Deputies of the 15th National Assembly of the French Fifth Republic
Democratic Movement (France) politicians
Women members of the National Assembly (France)
Councillors of Paris
Deputies of the 16th National Assembly of the French Fifth Republic